The magic SysRq key is a key combination understood by the Linux kernel, which allows the user to perform various low-level commands regardless of the system's state. It is often used to recover from freezes, or to reboot a computer without corrupting the filesystem.  Its effect is similar to the computer's hardware reset button (or power switch) but with many more options and much more control.

This key combination provides access to powerful features for software development and disaster recovery.  In this sense, it can be considered a form of escape sequence.  Principal among the offered commands are means to forcibly unmount file systems, kill processes, recover keyboard state, and write unwritten data to disk.  With respect to these tasks, this feature serves as a tool of last resort.

The magic SysRq key cannot work under certain conditions, such as a kernel panic or a hardware failure preventing the kernel from running properly.

Commands 

Furthermore, some keyboards may not provide a separate  key. In this case, a separate  key should be present.

On a ChromeOS device press .

SysRq functionalities can also be accessed without a keyboard. Note that some commands may be disabled out of the box as specified in the bitmask value in /proc/sys/kernel/sysrq.

sysrq: HELP : loglevel(0-9) reboot(b) crash(c) terminate-all-tasks(e) memory-full-oom-kill(f) kill-all-tasks(i) thaw-filesystems(j) sak(k) show-backtrace-all-active-cpus(l) show-memory-usage(m) nice-all-RT-tasks(n) poweroff(o) show-registers(p) show-all-timers(q) unraw(r) sync(s) show-task-states(t) unmount(u) force-fb(v) show-blocked-tasks(w) dump-ftrace-buffer(z)

Uses 
Before the advent of journaled filesystems a common use of the magic SysRq key was to perform a safe reboot of a Linux computer which has otherwise locked up (abbr. REISUB),
which avoided a risk of filesystem corruption.  With modern filesystems, this practice is not encouraged, offering no upsides over straight reoot, though the default value of kernel.sysrq in such distributions as Ubuntu and Debian remains 176 and 438  respectively.

Another past use was to kill a frozen graphical program, as the X Window System used to have complete control over graphical mode and input devices.

On distributions that do not include a  command, the key command  may sometimes be able to force a return to a text console. There are also distributions where  + (... ,) opens text consoles,  reenter GUI mode,  reenter GUI mode on the login page, in order to log in another user.

Configuration 
The feature is controlled both by a compile-time option in the kernel configuration, and a sysctl kernel parameter, .

On newer kernels (since 2.6.12), it is possible to have more fine-grained control over how the magic SysRq key can be used. On these machines, the number written to  can be 0, 1, or a number greater than 1 which is a bitmask indicating which features to allow.

Other ways to invoke Magic SysRq 
While the magic SysRq key was originally implemented as part of the kernel's keyboard handler for debugging, the functionality has been also exposed via the proc filesystem and is commonly used to provide extended management capabilities to headless and remote systems.

Many embedded systems have no attached keyboard, but instead use a serial console for text input/output to the running system. It is possible to invoke a Magic SysRq feature over a serial console by sending a serial break signal, followed by the desired key.  The method of sending a break is dependent on the terminal program or hardware used to connect to the serial console. A sysctl option needs to be set to enable this function.

The Linux daemons  and  provide a method of accessing SysRq features over a TCP connection after authenticating with a plain-text password. The  daemon will invoke pre-configured SysRq triggers when system load average exceeds a certain threshold.

The Xen hypervisor has functionality to send magic commands to hosted domains via its  command. Additionally, a SysRq command can be invoked from a Xen paravirtual console by sending a break sequence  followed by the desired key.

Chromebooks have a keyboard but no dedicated SysRq key. They use  instead, however some keys have a different function.

IBM Power Systems servers can invoke the Magic SysRq feature using  followed by the desired key from the Hardware Management Console.

IBM mainframe partitions can invoke the Magic SysRq feature using  followed by the desired key on 3270 or HMC console.

See also 
 Stop-A, key sequence used to access Sun Microsystems's Open Firmware (OpenBoot)
 Console server
 KVM switch
 System console

References

External links 

Mnemonics
Linux kernel features
System administration
Out-of-band management